The 1984 LPGA Championship was the 30th LPGA Championship, played May 31 to June 3 at Jack Nicklaus Golf Center at Kings Island in Mason, Ohio, a suburb northeast of Cincinnati.

Defending champion Patty Sheehan shot 131 (−13) on the weekend to win the second of her three LPGA Championships, ten strokes ahead of runners-up Pat Bradley and

Past champions in the field

Made the cut

Source:

Missed the cut

Source:

Final leaderboard
Sunday, June 3, 1984

Source:

References

External links
Golf Observer leaderboard
The Golf Center at Kings Island

Women's PGA Championship
Golf in Ohio
LPGA Championship
LPGA Championship
LPGA Championship
LPGA Championship
LPGA Championship
Women's sports in Ohio